The Laing Family is a British family.  The family is famous through their association with John Laing plc, a construction company founded in 1848.  The company grew under the leadership of Sir John Laing and passed through the hands of his sons Sir Kirby Laing and Sir Maurice Laing.  The Laing family is known for its contributions to charity and donated £8.88 million in 2002.  The family also lends its name to nine separate foundations.  The family's net worth in 2002 was £165 million and their charitable foundations totalled £200 million in assets.  The Laing family sold John Laing plc to Henderson Private Equity in December 2006.

Notable members
John Laing (businessman)
Kirby Laing
Maurice Laing
Martin Laing

References

External links
John Laing PLC Official site

British families